STS-49 was the NASA maiden flight of the Space Shuttle Endeavour, which launched on May 7, 1992. The primary goal of its nine-day mission was to retrieve an Intelsat VI satellite, Intelsat 603, which failed to leave Low Earth orbit two years before, attach it to a new upper stage, and relaunch it to its intended geosynchronous orbit. After several attempts, the capture was completed with the only three-person extravehicular activity (EVA) in space flight history. It would also stand until STS-102 in 2001 as the longest EVA ever undertaken.

Crew

Spacewalks 
  Thuot and Hieb  – EVA 1
EVA 1 Start: May 10, 1992 – 20:40 UTC
EVA 1 End: May 11, 1992 – 00:23 UTC
Duration: 3 hours, 43 minutes

  Thuot and Hieb  – EVA 2
EVA 2 Start: May 11, 1992 – 21:05 UTC
EVA 2 End: May 12, 1992 – 02:35 UTC
Duration: 5 hours, 30 minutes

  Thuot, Hieb and Akers  – EVA 3
EVA 3 Start: May 13, 1992 – 21:17 UTC
EVA 3 End: May 14, 1992 – 05:46 UTC
Duration: 8 hours, 29 minutes

  Thornton and Akers  – EVA 4
EVA 4 Start: May 14, 1992 – ~21:00 UTC
EVA 4 End: May 15, 1992 - ~05:00 UTC
Duration: 7 hours, 45 minutes

Crew seating arrangements

Mission highlights 
The Intelsat 603 satellite, stranded in an unusable orbit since launch aboard a Commercial Titan III launch vehicle in March 1990, was captured by crewmembers during an extravehicular activity (EVA) and equipped with a new perigee kick motor. The satellite was subsequently released into orbit and the new motor fired to put the spacecraft into a geosynchronous orbit for operational use.

The capture required three EVAs: a planned one by astronauts Thuot and Hieb who were unable to attach a capture bar to the satellite from a position on the RMS (Canadarm); a second unscheduled but identical attempt the following day; and finally an unscheduled but successful hand capture by Thuot, Hieb and Akers as commander Brandenstein delicately maneuvered the orbiter to within a few feet of the  communications satellite. An Assembly of Station by EVA Methods (ASEM) structure was erected in the cargo bay by the crew to serve as a platform to aid in the hand capture and subsequent attachment of the capture bar. A planned EVA also was performed by astronauts Thornton and Akers as part of the ASEM experiment to demonstrate and verify maintenance and assembly capabilities for Space Station Freedom. The ASEM space walk, originally scheduled for two successive days, was cut to one day because of the lengthy Intelsat retrieval operation.

Other "payloads of opportunity" experiments conducted included: Commercial Protein Crystal Growth (CPCG), Ultraviolet Plume Imager (UVPI) and the Air Force Maui Optical Station (AMOS) investigation. The mission was extended by two days in order to complete all the mission objectives.

On flight day 7, the Ku-band antenna lost its pointing capability. It had to be stowed manually during the final EVA.

The following records were set during the STS-49 mission: 
 First flight of the Space Shuttle Endeavour
 First (and only) EVA involving three astronauts.
 Second and fourth longest EVAs to date: 8 hours, 29 minutes, 7 hours, and 45 minutes. (Longest EVA to date was during STS-102 in 2001: 8 hours 56 minutes; third longest EVA was during STS-61 in 1993: 7 hour 54 minutes)
 First Shuttle mission to feature four EVAs.
 The second longest EVA time for a single Shuttle mission: 25 hours and 27 minutes, or 59:23 person hours. (The longest is STS-61 with 35 hours and 28 minutes)
 First Shuttle mission requiring three rendezvous with an orbiting spacecraft.
 First use of a drogue chute during a Shuttle landing.

Wake-up Calls 
NASA began a tradition of playing music to astronauts during the Project Gemini, and first used music to wake up a flight crew during Apollo 15. A special musical track is chosen for each day in space, often by the astronauts' families, to have a special meaning to an individual member of the crew, or in reference to the day's planned activities.

Gallery

See also 

 List of human spaceflights
 List of Space Shuttle missions
 Nikon NASA F4
 Outline of space science
 Space Shuttle

References

External links 

 NASA mission summary 
 STS-49 Video Highlights 

Intelsat
Space Shuttle missions
Edwards Air Force Base
Spacecraft launched in 1992
Spacecraft which reentered in 1992
Satellite servicing missions
May 1992 events